Patrik Leban (born 7 September 1989) is a Slovenian handball player who plays for SC Ferlach and the Slovenian national team.

He participated at the 2018 European Men's Handball Championship.

References

1989 births
Living people
Handball players from Ljubljana
Slovenian male handball players
Expatriate handball players
Slovenian expatriate sportspeople in Croatia